Damias biakensis is a moth of the family Erebidae. It is found in Papua New Guinea (Pulau Biak).

References

Moths described in 2009
Damias
Endemic fauna of the Biak–Numfoor rain forests